Canadian Stars is a Canadian interview television series which aired on CBC Television in 1978.

Premise
Canadian Stars featured interviews with Canadian-born entertainers of international presence such as Sharon Acker, Susan Clark, Monty Hall, Norman Jewison and Ted Kotcheff.

Scheduling
This half-hour series was broadcast on Mondays at 7:30 p.m. (Eastern) from 6 November to 25 December 1978. Episodes were repeated on Friday at 2:30 p.m. during this same time.

References

External links
 

CBC Television original programming
1978 Canadian television series debuts
1978 Canadian television series endings